Calliotropis galea is a species of sea snail, a marine gastropod mollusk in the family Eucyclidae.

Description
The length of the shell reaches 11.2 mm.

Distribution
This marine species occurs off the Philippines.

References

 Vilvens C. (2007) New records and new species of Calliotropis from Indo-Pacific. Novapex 8 (Hors Série 5): 1–72.

External links
 

galea
Gastropods described in 1953